Damien Lauretta (born 18 March 1992, in Cannes) is a French singer, record producer, songwriter and actor.

Life and career
He participated in several music programs, such as the Bataille des chorales (TF1), and Le Grand show des enfants (TF1). But his first real appearance on television was when he participated at The X Factor (M6) in 2011. He joined the group “2nd Nature” before being eliminated in 6th prime.

In 2014, he return on the screen, play one of the main role in «Dreams : 1 Rêve 2 Vies», series recorded in Saint Martin and broadcast on NRJ 12.

From 2014 to 2015, he played Clément and Alex in the third season of the famous Disney Channel Original Latin American series Violetta. He is the first French to work with Disney Channel International. He lived for one year in Buenos Aires, Argentina.

In 2016 his first music is “Fall in Love”  with 1 000 000 views on YouTube. The video clip was filmed in Bogota (Colombia).

The same year, for the tribute album of Daniel Balavoine ; Balavoine(s), he made a cover of "" a song extract of the French musical Starmania

His 2017’ single "Dreamin" has been #1 of charts in Canada. (Québec) 

In 2019 he released a single "Calle Verdi".

Then, Damien Lauretta released 1 new singles: “La Mer” (March 13, 2020).

He released his first album solo on January 14, 2022 titled "French Riviera"

Filmography

Discography

References

External links

https://youtube.com/user/DamienLauretta

1992 births
Living people
21st-century French male actors
21st-century French singers
The X Factor contestants
French male television actors
21st-century French male singers